Delwar Hossain Khan Dulu is a Bangladesh Nationalist Party politician and the former Member of Parliament of Mymensingh-4.

Career
Dulu was elected to parliament from Mymensingh-4 as a Bangladesh Nationalist Party candidate in 2001.

References

Bangladesh Nationalist Party politicians
Living people
8th Jatiya Sangsad members
People from Mymensingh District
Year of birth missing (living people)